Love's Harvest is a 1920 American silent drama film directed by Howard M. Mitchell and starring Shirley Mason, Raymond McKee and Edwin B. Tilton.

Cast
 Shirley Mason as Jane Day
 Raymond McKee as Jim Atherton
 Edwin B. Tilton as Allen Hamilton 
 Lila Leslie as Eleanor Hamilton

References

Bibliography
 Solomon, Aubrey. The Fox Film Corporation, 1915-1935: A History and Filmography. McFarland, 2011.

External links
 

1920 films
1920 drama films
1920s English-language films
American silent feature films
Silent American drama films
American black-and-white films
Films directed by Howard M. Mitchell
Fox Film films
1920s American films